Antaeotricha adornata is a moth of the family Depressariidae. It is found in Peru.

The wingspan is about 18 mm. The forewings are dark violet-fuscous with the extreme costal edge yellow-ochreous from the base to the bend and with an ochreous-whitish longitudinal dash from the base of the costa, in which is an elongate dark fuscous dot. The second discal stigma is black with a series of pre-marginal violet marks around the posterior part of the costa and termen, alternating with a marginal series of indistinct pale yellowish marks. The hindwings are blackish.

References

Moths described in 1915
adornata
Taxa named by Edward Meyrick
Moths of South America